Robert Downie (19 March 1867 in Glasgow – 27 July 1893) was a Scottish footballer who played for Thornliebank, Third Lanark and Scotland as a goalkeeper. He was a Scottish Cup winner in 1889.

References

Sources

External links

London Hearts profile

1867 births
1893 deaths
Scottish footballers
Scotland international footballers
Association football goalkeepers
Footballers from Glasgow
Thornliebank F.C. players
Third Lanark A.C. players
Place of death missing
Scottish Football League players